Chalalán is an ecological lodge of the Indigenous People of San José de Uchupiamonas dedicated to ethnic ecotourism. It is located in the Madidi National Park in Bolivia. The cabins are located in the vicinity of Chalalán Lake, on the south bank of the Tuichi River, about 100 km south west of Rurrenabaque.

Origins
Rurrenabaque is a coastal port where there has been economic and cultural exchange since at least the Inca period, for this reason the Indigenous People of San José de Uchupiamonas retains the Quechua language that is typical of highlands but also the Tacana language, typical of the Amazon of Bolivia. This trade between the highlands and the Amazon continued during the colony and the republic, attracting visitors from other regions of the world. Among them, adventurers such as Yossi Ghinsberg, who in 1981 participated in a failed expedition with Karl Ruprechter, Marcus Stamm and Kevin Gale, who were lost and separated. Gale was rescued by Uchupiamonas or "Josesanos" (Joshuaians) and was transferred to Rurrenabaque, where he recovered and began the search for Ghinsberg, who was rescued after three weeks of surviving alone and without equipment in the jungle. The friendship between Ghinsberg and the Josesanos led them to generate an ecotourism project aimed at improving the quality of life of these indigenous people and conserving biodiversity. The project was supported by the Inter-American Development Bank and Conservation International. The project concluded in 1999 with the constitution of Chalalán as a community venture.

Local administration
The lodge is now independently run by the indigenous population of San Jose de Uchupiamonas. Chalalan is highly recommended for travelers who like wildlife sighting, photography and educational tours.  Lake Chalalan, as well as the trip along the Tuichi River offers one of the most spectacular experiences in Bolivia. Great for seeing wild macaws, white-lipped peccaries, Brazilian Tapir, several species of monkeys and even the elusive jaguar. The lodge was built to include indigenous architectural techniques and local materials. Tours include exploring trail system, as well as canoe explorations.

Location 
Chalalán is located in the Madidi National Park, within the territory of the Indigenous People of San José de Uchupiamonas, near Lake Chalalán, near the south bank of the Tuichi River, 100 km from the city of Rurrenabaque. Access is by waterway, is navigated in wooden boats with outboard motors. The trip from Rurrenabaque takes from 5 to 6 hours, depending on the conditions of the river, while the return takes around 3 hours, due to the river current. Coordinates .

Characteristics 
The lodge has been built based on traditional tacana techniques, with overgrown wooden floors, chonta palm tree (Iriartea deltoidea) walls and jatata (Geonoma deversa) roofing. Chalalan has an energy matrix based on solar panels and a wastewater treatment system. The main activity is the walk through paths of environmental interpretation guided by members of the indigenous community of San José de Uchupiamonas, rowing canoe trips through Lake Chalalan and visits to the indigenous community.

Eventually, scientific research, workshops and seminars are carried out. Other frequent activities are the observation of birds and sport fishing.

Fauna 
One of the main activities is the observation of fauna in the paths of environmental interpretation. Chalalán represents and conserves a segment of the ecosystems of the Madidi National Park, corresponding to the foot of mount, the forest of low mountains of the Tropical Andes. Some common species are: squirrel monkey, whistling monkey, howler monkey and spider monkey, olingo, deer, capybara, mountain zeros like the pecari and occasionally sighted jaguars and pumas. Birding is also possible, sereres, herons, fishermen, macaws, eagles, hummingbirds, carpenters, and species associated with bodies of water are frequent.

Governance 
The lodge is owned by the Indigenous People of San José de Uchupiamonas, which designates a directory to which management responsibilities are delegated. The contact staff is also from the community. The enterprise has been self-sustaining and independent since 2000, since then it has operated uninterruptedly

In popular culture 

The 2013 documentary film, Gringo Trails, features an interview with Chalalán Ecolodge's, Guido Mamani, promoting the project as a main solution towards sustainable tourism.

Acknowledgments 
2017: Premios Maya "Best ecological enterprise"

2017: TripAdvisor "Certificate of Excellence"

2013: The Rough Guide "The 10 best jungle lodges in the amazon"

2011: National Geographic Traveler "The most authentic and unique hotels in Bolivia, chosen by National Geographic Traveler editors for the 2011 Stay List"

2008: National Geographic Adventure "50 Top Ecolodges: Jungle"

2008: Ecuator Initiative: "Equator Prize 2008 Winner"

See also 
 Lago Chalalán
 :es:Parque nacional Madidi

References

External links
http://www.chalalan.com
https://web.archive.org/web/20160908174313/http://www.conservation.org.bo/index.php
http://www.america-ecotours.com
 Ecuator Initiative
 National Geographic Traveler
 National Geographic Adventure
 TripAdvisor

Buildings and structures in La Paz Department (Bolivia)
Tourist attractions in La Paz Department (Bolivia)
1990 establishments in South America